Five Mile Beach or Holly Beach is the name of a barrier island on the Jersey Shore in Cape May County. The popular resort area collectively known as The Wildwoods are on Five Mile Beach and adjacent islands.

Geography
Five Mile Beach is a barrier island along the Atlantic Ocean between Hereford Inlet on the northeast, and the former Turtle Gut Inlet on the southwest. Grassy Sound, Richardson Sound, Taylor Sound and Sunset Lake, as well as an expanse of salt marsh and tidal channels separates Five Mile Beach from the mainland. The closing of Turtle Gut Inlet in 1922 has made Five Mile Beach continuous with Two Mile Beach.

Five Mile Beach was described in 1834 as,

An 1878 description of Five Mile Beach is as follows, viz,

Communities
Communities on the island include Wildwood, North Wildwood and Wildwood Crest. Diamond Beach, a part of Lower Township, is on Two Mile Beach and land reclaimed as a result of the closure of Turtle Gut Inlet; West Wildwood is on an adjacent island.

References

Barrier islands of New Jersey
Landforms of Cape May County, New Jersey
Islands of New Jersey